Ching (also spelled Chheng,  or Chhing) are finger cymbals played in Cambodian and Thai theater and dance ensembles.

Construction and use
Joined by a cord that runs through the center, ching are bowl-shaped, about 5 centimeters in diameter, and made of bronze alloy—iron, copper, and gold. They are struck together in a cyclical pattern to keep time and regulate the melody, and they function as the "timekeeper" of the ensemble. The rhythm typically consists of alternating the accented closed stroke with an unaccented open "ching" stroke. The name "ching" is probably onomatopoeic for this open sound.

Musical context
The Cambodian ensemble—which has traditionally accompanied court dance, masked plays, and shadow plays and ceremonies—is composed of vocalists and instruments: gong chimes, reed instruments, metallophones, xylophones, drums, and ching. A Thai ensemble consists of stringed fiddles, flutes, zither, xylophones, gong circles, drums, and ching. Melody in both Thai and Khmer musics is regulated by cyclic patterns realized on the drums and ching.

Historical significance

Evidence of the ching has been found in Angkor, the great temple-city of Khmer civilization, where classical art flourished between the ninth to the fifth centuries. Scenes carved in the walls of the temple depict celestial dancers with their musical instruments, including small cymbals (ching).

See also
Music of Cambodia
Music of Thailand

References

External links 
Sound sample, mong and ching

Cymbals
Cambodian musical instruments
Thai musical instruments